Pteronema is a genus of hydrozoans belonging to the monotypic family Pteronemidae.

Species:

Pteronema ambiguum 
Pteronema darwinii

References

Capitata
Hydrozoan genera